Dichomeris caryophragma is a moth in the family Gelechiidae. It was described by Edward Meyrick in 1923. It is found in Guyana and Pará, Brazil.

The forewings are ferruginous ochreous, suffused with ferruginous-brown costal and subcostal streaks confluent posteriorly and not reaching the apex. The costal edge is suffused with dark fuscous and there are two ferruginous-brown dots obliquely placed in the disc at one-third, sometimes absorbed in the subcostal streak. There is also an inwards-oblique streak from the subcostal streak before the middle to the dorsum concealing the anterior stigmata, a shorter less oblique streak on the end of the cell, and two hardly curved obscure shades enclosing a subterminal shade of ground colour. A marginal series of blackish triangular dots is found around the apex and termen. The hindwings are dark fuscous.

References

Moths described in 1923
caryophragma